Sá is a Portuguese, Spanish and Sephardic Jewish surname. It has a high incidence in Portuguese-speaking countries, such as Portugal, Brazil and Angola. It is still very common in countries like India, Cambodia, Vietnam, Nigeria, South Korea, Saudi Arabia, Turkey, Macao, Egypt, Indonesia and Morocco.

People
Alfredo de Sá, Portuguese politician and Prime Minister during the First Republic
André Sá, Brazilian tennis player
Armando Sá; Mozambican footballer
Ary de Sá, Brazilian long jumper
Bernardo de Sá, Portuguese politician and Prime Minister during the Constitutional Monarchy
Estácio de Sá, Portuguese military officer and founder of Rio de Janeiro in Brazil
Francisco de Sá, Portuguese politician and former Prime Minister
Francisco de Sá, Portuguese poet of the Renaissance
Francisco Sá, retired Argentine footballer
Gustavo Sá, Brazilian footballer
José Sá, Portuguese footballer
Luiza Sá, Brazilian musician
Manuel de Sá, Portuguese Jesuit theologian and exegete
Mário de Sá, Portuguese poet and writer
Mem de Sá, Portuguese Governor-General of Brazil
Ricardo Sá, Portuguese retired footballer
Roberta Sá, Brazilian singer
Roger De Sá, South African football manager
Rui de Sá, Angolan politician
Sandra de Sá, Brazilian singer and songwriter
Sílvio Sá, Portuguese footballer
Wanda Sá, Brazilian bossa nova singer and guitarist

Other
Bacalhau à Gomes de Sá, traditional Portuguese dry cod recipe named for Gomes de Sá
Coronel João Sá, municipality in the state of Bahia in the North-East region of Brazil
Escola Secundária Sá de Miranda, Portuguese Public school in civil parish of São Vicente, in the municipality of Braga
Estácio de Sá Futebol Clube, Brazilian football team
Escola de Samba Estácio de Sá, samba school of the city of Rio de Janeiro, Brazil
Francisco Sá, municipality in the north of the Brazilian state of Minas Gerais
Francisco de Sá Carneiro Airport, in Porto, Portugal
Sá da Bandeira, capital city of the Angolan province of Huíla
Senador Sá, municipality in the state of Ceará in the Northeast region of Brazil
Universidade Estácio de Sá, University in Rio de Janeiro, Brazil

Notes

Jewish surnames
Sephardic surnames
Portuguese-language surnames
Surnames of German origin